Brachodes beryti is a moth of the family Brachodidae. It is found in Greece and the Near East.

References

Moths described in 1867
Brachodidae
Moths of Europe